Alvin and the Chipmunks is a virtual band created by Ross Bagdasarian, Sr., for a novelty record in 1958.

Alvin and the Chipmunks may also refer to:

 The Alvin Show, featuring Alvin and the Chipmunks and Clyde Crashcup, a TV series aired from 1961 to 1962
 Alvin and the Chipmunks (1983 TV series), a TV series aired from 1983 to 1990
 Alvin and the Chipmunks in film, a series of feature-length films
 Alvin and the Chipmunks Meet Frankenstein (1999)
 Alvin and the Chipmunks Meet the Wolfman (2000)
 Alvin and the Chipmunks (film) (2007)
 Alvin and the Chipmunks: Original Motion Picture Soundtrack, the soundtrack album of the 2007 film
 Alvin and the Chipmunks (video game), a video game based on the film
 Alvin and the Chipmunks: The Squeakquel (2009)
 Alvin and the Chipmunks: Chipwrecked (2011)
 Alvin and the Chipmunks: Chipwrecked (video game), a video game based on the film
 Alvin and the Chipmunks: The Road Chip (2015)
 Alvinnn!!! and the Chipmunks, a 2015 CGI animated TV series revival